Roberts Radio is a British consumer electronics company that produces radios and related audio equipment. Based in Mexborough, the company has been making radios since its foundation in 1932 and claim to be the oldest active radio manufacturer in the UK.

History
Roberts Radio was founded in 1932 by Harry Roberts (1910-1969) of Mile End and Leslie Bidmead of Kilburn. They financed the down payment on a small factory in London's Soho by selling Bidmead's motorbike. A few years later they moved across Oxford Street to no. 41 Rathbone Place. During the Blitz in the Second World War, they moved to East Molesey in Surrey. During this time the majority of production shifted from domestic radios to morse code tappers.

Roberts resumed producing domestic radios after the war and eventually gained a reputation of quality. They received a Royal Warrant to the Queen in 1955 and later another to the Queen Mother and the Prince of Wales in the 1980s. Another warrant was granted via the purchase of Dynatron Radio Ltd. in 1981.

The R66 portable valve radio was launched by Roberts in 1956, followed by their first portable transistor radio the RT1 in 1959. Its box-shaped design with a carry handle became popular among the public and celebrities in the 1960s, shaping the familiar Roberts design. It was designed by Bidmead, apparently inspired by a handbag belonging to his wife Elsie.

In 1962, the company had a purpose built factory constructed in West Molesey. Co-founder Harry Roberts died in 1969, succeeded by son Richard who served until his own death in 1991.

The company was struggling in the 1980s with the rise of television and imported Japanese electronics. In 1989, a classic red Roberts radio appeared in a Martini TV advert, which revived interest in the product. A replica of the 1950s radio was created and sold out in two limited runs. Public popularity led to the full reissue of the original design as the Revival in 1993 in original red colour, with various new colours and designs numbering sixteen by the year 2000. The Revival has been Britain's best selling portable radio ever since.

Roberts Radio was purchased by privately owned GlenDimplex Group in 1994. The company then moved headquarters and production north to South Yorkshire joining other GlenDimplex ventures.

Roberts produced their first DAB digital radio in 1999 and their first internet radio in 2007.

Notes

References

External links
 Roberts Radio website

Electronics companies of the United Kingdom
Manufacturing companies of the United Kingdom
Companies based in Rotherham
Electronics companies established in 1932
Manufacturing companies established in 1932
1932 establishments in England
British Royal Warrant holders
British brands
Radio manufacturers